Palm Beach is a coastal suburb in the City of Gold Coast, Queensland, Australia.

Geography 
Palm Beach is bounded to the north by Tallebudgera Creek, to the east by the Coral Sea, to the south by Currumbin Creek, and to the west by the Pacific Motorway.

Palm Beach has thrice been voted cleanest beach in Queensland.

Certainly subdivided by the mid-1950s the subdivision is unusual in the way in which it straddles both sides of the highway. Streets along the highway are named from first to twenty-eighth starting at the southern end of the area and each second one terminates at the highway. Between the beach and the highway in the southern part of the area the narrow Jefferson Lane links across streets. In this lane are some of the earliest and most basic of Gold Coast beach "shacks", some on blocks of land valued in millions of dollars. There is some suggestion that these in fact predate the subdivision and other remnants of an earlier settlement.

Recent extensions of the Palm Beach area to the west have created new subdivisions with different characteristics including a small section of canal development. The area is bounded to the north by the Tallebudgera Creek and the national recreation camp and to the south by tower developments at the mouth of Currumbin Creek. The creek mouths of Tallebudgera and Currumbin have been stabilised with training walls built during the 1970s. Both of the Creek entrances are dredged on an annual basis. There are nearshore bait reefs along Palm Beach and offshore there are fishing reefs that are some of the most productive of the Gold Coast.

Laguna Lake is in the south western part of the suburb, with Elizabeth Sloper Gardens park around its edges. The Tallebudgera Creek Tourist Park, at the northern end of Palm Beach, provides holiday accommodation mainly for families. The adjacent Tallebudgera Recreational Camp is a national fitness camp visited by children from throughout Queensland.

Coastal management structures at Palm Beach include training walls at Currumbin and Tallebudgera Creek entrances and mini groynes at 11th and 21st Avenues. The Gold Coast Oceanway is of particular poor quality through Palm Beach due to the majority of the beachfront being effectively in private ownership. Recent loss of sand due to unusual weather and tidal patterns have caused some houses along the beachfront to lose their yards to the erosion.

History 
Palm Beach Baptist Church opened on Saturday 8 December 1928. It was the first church opened in Palm Beach. It was in Ninth Avenue. In 1969 the original building was demolished and replaced with a brick building. In 2000 the Palm Beach site was sold and the congregation built the Reedy Creek Baptist Church at 10 Gemvale Road, Reedy Creek.

Palm Beach Surf Club was established in 1930.

Palm Beach-Currumbin State High School opened on 24 January 1972.

Palm Beach State School opened on 4 February 1974.

The Palm Beach Library opened in 1998 and had a major refurbishment in 2011. The library closed down in early 2021 and was replaced with a library kiosk. 

Palm Beach was judged Queensland's Cleanest Beach in 1999 and again in 2000 and 2011 by the Keep Australia Beautiful Council.

Extreme erosion along Palm Beach in 2011 revealed rusted car bodies, among other aged items, usually many meters below sand.

Heritage listings 
Palm Beach has a heritage site:

 Currumbin Creek: former Currumbin Creek Railway Bridge on the South Coast railway line

Education 
Palm Beach State School is a government primary (Prep-6) school for boys and girls at 13-19 Nineteenth Avenue. In 2017, the school had an enrolment of 511 students with 37 teachers (33 full-time equivalent) and 21 non-teaching staff (12 full-time equivalent). It includes a special education program. 

Students in southern Palm Beach can attend Currumbin State School in Currumbin.

Palm Beach Currumbin State High School is a government secondary (7-12) school for boys and girls at Thrower Drive. In 2017, the school had an enrolment of 2457 students with 179 teachers (173 full-time equivalent) and 87 non-teaching staff (70 full-time equivalent). It includes a special education program.

Students in western Palm Beach can attend Elanora State High School in Elanora.

Tallebudgera Outdoor and Environmental Education Centre is an Outdoor and Environmental Education Centre at 1525 Gold Coast Highway.

Amenities 
The Gold Coast City Council operate a community lounge and public library at Eleventh Avenue.

Palm Beach Surf Club at 117 Jefferson Lane provides surf lifesaving services and clubhouse dining facilities. Established in 1930, there has never been a fatality in its flagged beach zones.

Our Lady of the Way Church Catholic Church is at 14 Eleventh Avenue. It is part of the Burleigh Heads Catholic Parish within the Archdiocese of Brisbane.

Sports and recreation 
Neptune Royal Life Saving Club was the first female only club in Australia and still provides patrol services for people swimming in Tallebudgera Creek estuary. It remains the only club on the Gold Coast not affiliated with Surf Life Saving.

Palm Beach is also patrolled by the Palm Beach Surf Life Saving Club at 7th Avenue and Pacific Surf Life Saving Club near 19th Avenue.

Local sporting clubs include soccer club Palm Beach Sharks, Palm Beach Currumbin Cricket Club, Palm Beach Currumbin Alleygators RUC and Palm Beach Currumbin Australian Football Club.

See also 

 List of Gold Coast suburbs

References

External links

 
Heritage Tour - Palm Beach

Suburbs of the Gold Coast, Queensland
Beaches of Queensland